Television in Finland is one of the main media outlets in Finland. The following is a list of television series produced in Finland and their date of first airing.

-
10 Finnish Architects: An Outsider's View (2003) (mini)
112 auttajat (1999)
30-luvun mies (1969)
4Pop (2003)
50 pientä minuuttia (1967)
6pack (2008)
À la Laila (1967) (mini)
Ähläm sähläm (2006)
Äijät (2007)
Äitien sota (2015)
Äkkiä Anttolassa (1999)
Ällitälli (1971)
ÄWPK - Älywapaa palokunta (1984)
Île, L' (1987) (mini)
Ögonaböj (2005)

A
Aaken ja Sakun kesäkeittiö (1999)
Aamu-TV (1997)
Aarresaaren sankarit (2003) (mini)
Aatami & Beetami (1997)
Act!one (2004)
Ajankohtainen kakkonen (1969)
Ajoneuvos (2006)
Akkaa päälle (1994)
Akkulaturit (1995)
Alhola (1991)
Angry Birds Toons
Alivaltiosihteeri muistelee (1993) (mini)
Alivaltiosihteeri valvoo (1994) (mini)
Alppikengistä jäljet vain jää (1973)
Alright? Alright! (2005)
Ammuntaa - Ulla Tapaninen (1996)
Amorin kaaret (1998)
Angela ja ajan tuulet (1999)
Annan ja Vasilin rakkaus (1988)
Ansa ja Oiva (1998)
Anteeksi kuinka? (1993)
Antiikkia, antiikkia (1997)
Antiikkieno (2007)
Arman reilaa (2004)
Arto Nyberg (2004)
Arvo Ylppö 100 vuotta (1987)
Arvokkaasti (2000)
Assari (2005)
Ateenasta Los Angelesiin (1984)
Autopalatsi (1994)
Autre Iran, L' (2003)
Avec Sara (2005)

B
Baari (2006)
Barr-niminen mies (1984)
Basaari (1996)
Bella (2006)
Ben Furman (1998)
Benner & Benner (2001)
Bettina S. (2002)
Big Bang (1998)
Big Brother Suomi (2005)
Blondi tuli taloon - Sattui kerran kesällä (1997)
Blondi tuli taloon (1994)
Bongari (1994)
Bonus (2002)
BumtsiBum! (1997)

C
Café Kirpputori (1996)
Camping Satumaa (1998)
Chansen (1990)
Cosmomind (2003)

D
Day the Universe Changed, The (1985)
Diili (2005)
Diili+ Johtoryhmä (2005)
Din vredes dag (1991)
Dirlandaa (2000) (mini)
Doing! (1985)
Donna Paukku (2007)
Double Trouble (1998)
Duudsoni-elämää (2004)

E
Edessä lupaava tulevaisuus (1991)
Ei itketä lauantaina (1993)
Ei kannata hellittää (2003)
Einstein (2006)
Elina, mitä mä teen? (1999) (mini)
Elixir Sport (2002)
Ellen Express (2005)
Eläinopissa (2003)
Elämä on näytelmä (1999) (mini)
Elämänmeno (1978)
Enkeleitä ja pikkupiruja (1998)
Enkelten keittiö (1989)
Enkelten siipi (1993) (mini)
Epilaattori (2004)
Escort (TV show) (2003)
Esiripun takaa (1995) (mini)
Euroviisut (2004) (mini)
Eurovision laulukilpailu, Suomen karsinta (2005) (mini)
Evvk (2004)
Extreme duudsonit (2001)

F
Fabio & Fabrizio (2006)
Fakta homma (1986)
Falkenswärds möbler (2000)
Fallesmannin Arvo ja minä (1995) (mini)
Far Out (2001/II)
Fasaanit (1990)
FC Nörtit (2006)
Firklang (1965)
Firma (2005)
Fling (2004)
Frank Pappa Show (1991)
Fyra sånger från Finland (2004)

G
G5 - Gimme Five! (2004)
Get Up, Stand Up (2005)
Giljotiini (2001)
Gladiaattorit (1993)
Gold Rush, The (2000) (mini)
Greed (2000)
Groovymeisseli (1997)
Gränsfall (2007) (mini)

H
Haastattelijana Mirja Pyykkö (1993)
Halleluja (1998) (mini)
Haluatko filmitähdeksi? (2003)
Haluatko miljonääriksi? (1999)
Hamsterit (1982) (mini)
Handu pumpulla (2005)
Hannu ja Kettu (1992)
Hanski (1966)
Harakanpesä (2003)
Hardwick (1988)
Harjunpää ja heimolaiset (1995)
Harjunpää och antastaren (1985)
Harjunpää och kalla döden (1983)
Harvoin tarjolla (2008)
Hauskat kotivideot (2005)
Havukka-ahon ajattelija (1971)
Headhunters (2004)
Hecumania (1996)
Hei hulinaa (1988)
Heikki ja Kaija (1961)
Heikoin lenkki (2002)
Heksa ja Leksa (1989)
Hellapoliisit (1989)
Hello Hello Hello (1975)
Helsinki 1952: Games of the XV Olympiad (1952) (mini)
Helsinki 450 - tietokilpailu (2000)
Hep (1983)
Hepskukkuu (1979)
Herkku & Partanen (1995)
Herra 47 (1994)
Herra Kenonen (1969)
Herrat nauraa (1999)
Hiljaista on (2003)
Hilma (1969)
Hirveä juttu (1993)
Historiske arbejdspladser (2003)
Hittimittari (1984)
Hobitit (1993) (mini)
Hohto (2004)
Hohtohetki (1997)
Hoi maamme suomi (1981)
Hotelli Sointu (2000)
Hovimäen aikaan (1999)
Hovimäki (1999)
Huh hellettä! (1986)
Hui helinää (1989)
Huijarinainen (1995) (mini)
Hukkaputki (1981)
Hullu Suomi (1992)
Hulukkoset (1974)
Huojuva talo (1990) (mini)
Huomenna on paremmin (1992)
Hupiklubi (2002)
Hurja joukko (1998)
Hurja joukko (2002) (mini)
Hurrit (2002)
Huuliveikot (1998)
Huuma (2005)
Huvin vuoksi (1996)
Hydronauts, The (2006)
Hylättyjen klubi (1993)
Hymyhuulet (1987)
Hynttyyt yhteen (1991)
Hyppönen Enbuske Experience (2002)
Hyvien ihmisten kylä (1993)
Hyvä veli (1995)
Hyvät herrat (1990)
Hyvät naiset ja herrat (1986)
Hyvät, pahat ja rumat (1992)
Hyvät, Rumat & Rillumarei (1983)
Häkkilinnut (1991)
Hämmentäjien kuningas (2002)
Häräntappoase (1989)
Hömppäveikot (1996)

I
Idan jengi (1993)
Idols (2003/II)
Ihana mies (1999) (mini)
Ihme juttu (1990) (mini)
Ihmeidentekijät (1996)
Ihmisen käsikirja (2000)
Ihmisen paras ystävä (1990)
Ikimuistoinen (2004)
Ilettääkö (1988)
Ilkamat (1970)
Illan Kajo: Herrain metkuja (1999)
Illan päätteeksi, Timo T.A. Mikkonen (1993)
Illuusio (2006)
Ilman kavaluutta (1996) (mini)
Ilona Rauhala -keskusteluohjelma (2007)
Ilonen talo (2006) (mini)
Ilotalo (1988)
Iltalypsy (1993)
Insider (1999) (mini)
Iris Klewe (1981)
Irtiottoja (2003)
Isabella (2006) (mini)
Iskelmäprinssi (1998)
Isku suoneen (1988)
Isänmaan kaikuja (1991)
Isänmaan toivot (1998)
Itse valtiaat (2001)
Itämeren helmet (2004) (mini)

J
J.K. Paasikivi (1988)
Jaajon jacuzzi (2003)
Jako Kahteen (2006)
Jatkoaika (1967)
Jauhon kauppa (2002)
Jazzia Viiskulmassa (2003)
Jenseits der Morgenröte (1985) (mini)
Jeopardy! (2007)
JES! (1995)
JET - Jaa ei tyhjiä (1984)
Joka kodin asuntomarkkinat (1991)
Jokainen vieras on laulun arvoinen (2007)
Jokamiehen kymppitonni (1991)
Joonas Hytönen show (1999)
Joonas (2006)
Jopet-show (2005)
Jos sais kerran (2002)
Jos (2004)
Joulukalenteri (1963-2002)
Jukka Puotilat Show (1998)
Julmahuvi esittää: Mennen tullen (2000) (mini)
Jumalan kaikki oikut (2006) (mini)
Junnutonni (1991)
Jurismia! (2002)
Juu ei (2002)
Juulian totuudet (2002) (mini)
Jyrki Countdown (1996)
Jyrki (1995)
JÅ-NE-TV (2007)
Jäitä hattuun (1994)
Jäähyväiset lasihevoselle (1985)
Jäähyväiset rakkaimmalle (1993) (mini)
Jörn Donnerin kuusi elämää (2003)

K
K-70 (2008)
K. Tervo (1995)
Kaatis (1988)
Kadonnut näky (1997) (mini)
Kahdeksan surmanluotia (1972) (mini)
Kahden vaiheilla (1994)
Kaikilla mausteilla (1996)
Kaikki kotona (2000)
Kaikki kunnossa (2007)
Kaikkien valehtelijoiden äiti (1993)
Kaken pesula (1997)
Kalapuikkokeitto (1998)
Kansakunnan käännekohta (2006)
Kansalaiset"  (mini)Kansallistietäjä (2008)Kansanhuvit (1992)Kansankynttilät (2003)Karjalan kunnailla (2007)Katapultti (1971)Katso naamion taa (1989) (mini)Katso pois (2002)Kaunis mies (2003) (mini)Kaupungin kaunein lyyli (1990)Kaverille ei jätetä (1999)Kaverukset (1961)Keltaisen kirahvin eläintarinat (2003) (mini)Kertun pariasiaa (1999)Kesäillan valssi (1996)Kesäkerttu (1998)Kesäparatiisi (2002)Ketjureaktio (2002)Ketonen & Myllyrinne (2006)Kettunen (televisio-ohjelma) (1988)Kiimaiset poliisit (1993)Kiinnisidottu (1994) (mini)Kiitos ja hyvästi (1992)Kippariklubi (1960)Kirjava silta (2000)Kirje isältä (2003) (mini)Kirvesmiehet (2001)Kissa vieköön (1987)Kiurunkulma (1966)Kivatsulle.tv (2003)Kivi ja kilpi (2001)Kivisydän (1984)Klaustrofobia (1982)Klubi (1998)Kodin kääntöpiiri (2001)Kohtaamiset ja erot (1994)Koiramäki (2004) (mini)Koivula ja tähdet (2000)Kokkisota (1999)Kolarikorjaamossa kummittelee (1987)Kolmannen korvapuusti (1993)Komeaa sukua (1990)Komikfabrik (2006)Kommissarie Winter (2001)Konstan koukkuja (1998)Konstan pylkkerö (1994)Kontrapunkt (TV series) (1971)Korkeajännitystä - eli sähköä kotiinkuljetettuna (2001)Korvatunturin tallin joulu (1999)Kosketuksessa (2007)Koskinen (2021)Kotikatu (1995)Kotirappu (1987)Kova laji (2003)Kovaa maata (1994)Krisse Road Show (2007)Krisse (2003)Krøniken (2004)Kuka uskoo haikaraa? (1984) (mini)Kuka, mitä, häh? (2007)Kukkivat roudan maat (1981) (mini)Kulkija Kuosmanen ja kappale kauneinta Suomea (1998)Kulkuri ja kaunottaret (1999)Kultainen noutaja (2007) (mini)Kultainen salama (1994)Kultajukka & kumppanit (2000)Kultajukka (1998)Kultakuume.com (2001) (mini)Kumman kaa (2003)Kummeli (1991)Kunnon sotamies Svejkin seikkailuja (1968)Kurvi (1980)Kuten haluatte (1966)Kuudesti laukeava (1992)Kuumia aaltoja (2003)Kuusikko ja kuoleman varjot (1997)Kuutamolla (2001)Kvartetti (1991) (mini)Kyky 80 (1980)Kyllä isä osaa (1994)Kylmän kosketus (1999) (mini)Kylmäverisesti sinun (2000)Kylä (1980)Kymmenen uutiset (1981)Kymppitonni (1985)Käenpesä (2004)Kätevä emäntä (2004)Käytöskukka (1966)Köyhät pojat (1991) (mini)

LLabyrintti (1994)Lapinlahden Linnut show (1993)Lapsuuteni (1967) (mini)Lasse Pöysti show (1959)Lauantaitanssit"
Laura kaupungissa (2005)
Laura Wou! (1999)
Laura (2002) (mini)
Legend to Ride, A (1997)
Lehmän vuosi (2006)
Leijonan kita (2007)
Leikin varjolla (2002)
Lemmenleikit (2008)
Lemmikit esittää (2007) (mini)
Lemmikit (2006)
Lentsu (1990) (mini)
Levyraati (1960)
Liemessä (2004)
Lighthouse (1968) (mini)
Lihaksia ja luoteja (1996)
Liljankukka (1997)
Linnunradan pianobaari (1998)
Loistavat Jerkun pojat (1999)
Loman tarpeessa (2005)
Lottovoittajien maa (1990)
Love Boat: The Next Dame, The (2000)
Lukio (2008)
Luonnollinen kuolema (1992) (mini)
Luonnonmukainen rakastaja (1992)
Lyhyitä erikoisia (1985)
Lyyli ja aikamiespoikansa Anselmi (1969)
Lähempänä taivasta (1996)
Lämminveriset (1996)
Läpiveto (2006)
Lääkärit tulessa (1998)

M
M-show (1971)
Maailman kahdeksan ihmettä (1990)
Maailman ympäri (2000)
Maailmassa on virhe (1998)
Maajussille morsian (2006)
Maan mainiot (2002)
Maan mitta (2007) (mini)
Madventures (2002)
Mahabharata, The (1989) (mini)
Mahdottoman tavallinen Jorma Laine (1995)
Mahtihäät (2000) (mini)
Majakka (2006)
Makaroff & Modig (2003)
Maleena (2008) (mini)
Malesian matkaajat (2004)
Mallikoulu 2005 (2005)
Manitbois (1992)
Mankeli (2000)
Manne-tv (2007) (mini)
Marcon kanssa kahden (2000)
Maria, Maria (2007)
Markus Kajon ihme pätkiä (2003)
Mazarin (1978) (mini)
McCoys Show, The (2003)
Me kastelijat (1997)
Me Stallarit (2004)
Me Tammelat (1969)
Me, Myself and I (2007)
Mediapeli (1995)
Megavisa (1991)
Meidän jengi (2005)
Merirosvoradio (1974)
Metsolat (1993)
Mikset sä soita (1994)
Miljonääri-Jussi (2004)
Milkshake (1994)
Minun uskoni (2003)
Minä ja Sarasvuo (1995)
Mire Bala Kale Hin - tarinoita matkan takaa (2001)
Missä olet Peter Aava? (2002) (mini)
Missä vika? (2004)
Mitä ihmettä? (2003)
Mitäs sais olla (1998)
Mogadishu Avenue (2006)
Mollen löytötavaraa (1990)
Moomin (1990)
Mooseksen perintö (2001)
Moottori-ilta Pasilassa (1994)
Mr. Finland 2003: sensuroimaton (2003)
Muisti palaa pohjaan (2004)
Muistojeni Karjala (2004)
Mummo (1987)
Mummoni ja Mannerheim (1971)
Munthe (1995) (mini)
Muodollisesti pätevä (1999)
Musta laatikko (1997)
Musta sukka (2001) (mini)
Musta tuntuu (1985)
Mustajärven oudot linnut (1991)
Mustan kissan kuja (2000)
Mustapartainen mies (1990)
Mutapainin ystävät (1984)
My Secret Summer (1995)

N
Naapurilähiö (1969)
Nahkiaiset (1998)
Napakymppi (1985)
Napaseutu (1994)
Naurun paikka (1995)
Neilin lähteet (1984)
Nelosen uutiset (1998)
Nettikymppitonni (2000)
Nettimatkaaja Veikka Gustafsson (2002)
Neurovisio (1992)
Nevada (2006)
Niilin lähteillä (1984)
Nitrokabinetti (1997)
Nitroliiga (1993)
NO TV (1990)
Nollatoleranssi (2004) (mini)
Noppapotti (1995)
Noriko Show (2004)
Nortia (1996)
Not Born to Rock (2007)
Nousevan auringon Kajo (2006)
Noutajat.net (2000)
NU er det NU (2000)
Nuijasota - 1500-luvun tarinoita (1993) (mini)
Nyhjää tyhjästä (1991)
Näytönpaikka (1995)

O
Oi kallis kaupunki (1975)
Ollaan kuin kotonanne (1981)
Omat jutut (1977)
Onnelliset (2005)
Onnenpyörä (1993)
Onnenruudut (1998)
Operaatio Interheil (2001) (mini)
Operation Stella Polaris (2003) (mini)
Osakkeet nousussa, Osku (1990)
Osasto 5 (2005)
Ota ja omista (1997)
Ota mut kyytiin (2000) (mini)
Ottaako sydämestä? (1995)
Ou Nou! (2001)
Outolintu (2004)
Overdose (2002)

P
PORTKIDS: Petualangan besar dari abdias perahu (2004)
Paavo ja Raili (2004)
Paholaisen tytär (2002) (mini)
Painajainen (1988) (mini)
Pakanamaan kartta (1991) (mini)
Pakkoruotsia på svenska teatern (2002)
Palikkatesti (1991)
Paljon pelissä (2004)
Paluu naapurilähiöön (1997)
Paluu Timbuktuun (1996)
Palvelijat (2003)
Pappa rakas (1993)
Pappia kyydissä (1998)
Parempi myöhään (1979)
Parhaat vuodet (2000)
Pari sanaa lemmestä (1992)
Pariskooppi (2004)
Paristo (2002)
Pasila (2007)
Passi ja hammasharja (1996)
Pekko aikamiespoika (1993)
Pelastajat (1998)
Pelastajat (2007)
Pelastakaa sotamies Hytönen (2004)
Pelimies Vesku (1994)
Pelkkää lihaa (2007) (mini)
Pelkovaara (2004)
Peltiheikit (1995)
Perjantai-illan unelma (2005)
Perkele - lisää kuvia Suomesta (1999) (mini)
Persona non grata (2003)
Pertsa ja Kilu (1975) (mini)
Pertsa ja Kilu (2000)
Peräkamaripojat (2001)
Petelius ja Ruonansuu show (2001)
Pictionary (1998)
Pidetään yhtä (2002)
Pieni ihmissydän (1989)
Pieni pala Jumalaa (1999) (mini)
Pieni rakkaustarina (2004) (mini)
Piepposkan parempi arki (1998)
Pietarin myytti (2003) (mini)
Piikkis (1987)
Pikku kakkonen (1977)
Pimeä puoli (2005)
Pimeän hehku (1996)
Pirjo, Pirjo ja Mato (2005)
Pirunnyrkki (1990)
Plåstrets pirat-tv (1994) (mini)
Poikkeustila (2007)
Pokerimestari 2006 (2006)
Pokeritähti 2007 (2007)
Poliisi-tv (1989)
Poliisijuttu (1988)
Pop-komissio (2001)
Poppia kyydissä (2004)
Popstars (2002/II)
Presidentin kanslia (2008)
Presidentin mies (1998) (mini)
Presidentit (2005)
Presidenttipeli (2000)
Pressiklubi (2005)
Pudonneita (1994)
Puhtaat valkeat lakanat (1993)
Pulkkinen (1999)
Pulttibois (1989)
Punahilkka (2007) (mini)
Putkinotko (1998) (mini)
Puukoi (1994)
Puutarhaunelmia (2005)
Päin perhettä (1992)
Päivän Lööppi (1997)
Päivärinta (2000)
Pääluottamusmies (1970)
Pääroolissa (2005)
På vårt vis (2006)

R
R-Studio (2002)
Raid (2000)
Rajametsän tarinoita (2004)
Rakastuin mä luuseriin (2005)
Rakkaat sisaret (1989)
Rakkauden jano (1995)
Rakkauden nälkä (2007) (mini)
Rakkauden tanssi (1998) (mini)
Randström & Co (2001)
Ranuan kummit (2003)
Ratikka-Raimo (1999)
Rauta-aika (1982) (mini)
Reinikainen (1982)
Reitti 44 (2005)
Remontti (2003)
Rieku ja Raiku (1998) (mini)
Rikas ja kunniallinen (1988)
Rikas mies (2004) (mini)
Rikos ja rangaistus (1994)
Rikospoliisi ei laula (2006)
Rikospoliisi Maria Kallio (2003)
Rikostarinoita Suomesta (2001)
Rillumarei ja reipastamenoa (1995)
Ring-A-Ling (2003)
Rintamäkeläiset (1972)
Risto Räppääjä (2000) (mini)
Ristorante (1994)
Rivitaloelämää (1989)
Robotti von Rosenbergin tutkimukset (1984)
Rock Stop (1988)
Ruben & Joonas (2004)
Ruben (2006)
Runoja & Roskia (2007)
Ruonansuu & Petelius Co (1997)
Ruusun aika (1990)
Ruutulippu (1991)
Räsypokka (2002)
Rölli (1986)
Röyhkeä diplomaatti (2007)

S
Saastamoisen poika (1989)
Sairaskertomuksia (2004)
Salapoliisi Tuukka Koljonen ja vaaralliset tehtävät (1989)
Salatut elämät (1999)
Salli mun nauraa (1993)
Salonki (1996)
Samaa sukua, eri maata (1998)
Sami kokkaa (2004)
Samppanjaa ja vaahtokarkkeja (1995)
Sana mania (1999)
Sartsan parantola (2006)
Sata sanaa (2003)
Sataman valot (1992)
Satua ja totta (1997)
Satumainen Onni (1987)
Saunavuoro (2004)
Schlager på lager (2002)
Se on siinä (2001)
Seitsemän kuolemansyntiä (1988)
Seitsemän veljestä (1989) (mini)
Seitsemän (2001)
Seppo Hovin seurassa (1990)
Septet (1966)
Sergein totuus (1996) (mini)
SF-studio (2004)
SF-tarina (1991) (mini)
Sikanautaa (2000) (mini)
Sillä silmällä (2005)
 (1968)
Sininen laulu - Suomen taiteiden tarina (2003)
Sinitaivas (1989) (mini)
Sinäkö presidentiksi (2005) (mini)
Sirkka ja Sakari (1975)
Sirkus (2007)
Sirkuspelle Hermanni (1978)
Sisaret (2003)
Sisarukset (1965)
Sisko ja sen veli (1986)
Siunattu hulluus (1975) (mini)
Sivistyskansan tarina (2006) (mini)
Skärgårdsdoktorn (1997)
Snapphanar (2006) (mini)
Sodan ja rauhan miehet (1978) (mini)
Soitinmenot (1985)
Soldater i månsken (2000) (mini)
Solstenen (1986) (mini)
Soppamies (2001)
Sorainen (Harkimo) (2006)
Sorjonen (2016)
Spede show (1971)
Spede special (1988)
Speden parhaat (2003)
Speden sallitut leikit (1990)
Speden saluuna (1965)
Speden spelit (1992)
Speden tee-se-itse TV (1990)
Spedevisio (1965)
Spirello (2003)
Stalingrad (2003)
Stiller (1998)
Stormskärs Maja (1975)
Studio Impossible (2006)
Studio Julmahuvi (1998)
Sub Marine (2003)
Sukka hukassa (1991)
Sukujuhla (1998)
Suloinen myrkynkeittäjä (1995) (mini)
Sunnuntaikomitea (2003)
SunRadio (1999)
Suojelijat (2008)
Suomalainen rakkaus (1980)
Suomen parhaat (1994)
Suomen Robinson (2004)
Suomen tietoviisas (1990)
Suomenlahden hylyt (1996)
Suomi Pop (1985)
Suomi-Filmin tarina (1993) (mini)
Suoraa huutoa! (2004)
Susi rajalla (2000)
Susikoira Roi - Seikkailu saaristossa (1988)
Susikoira Roi (1987)
Suuri Kupla (2001)
Suuri luokkakokous (2000)
Suuri seikkailu (2001)
Suurin pudottaja (2006)
Sydän kierroksella (2006) (mini)
Sydän toivoa täynnä (1997)
Sydänjää (2007)
Sydänten akatemia (1998)
Syksyn sävel (1968)
Syrhämä (2003)
Sämpy (1974)
Sänky (2002)

T
T.i.l.a (2001)
Tabu (1986)
Tahdon asia (2005)
Taikapeili (1995)
Taistelevat julkkikset (2004)
Taiteilijaelämää (2005)
Taivaan tulet (2007)
Taivas sinivalkoinen (2001) (mini)
Taivasalla (1994)
Taivaskanavan tähdet (1999)
Takaisin kotiin (1995)
Talent (2007)
Talo Italiassa (2005)
Tammerkosken sillalla (1995)
Tangomarkkinat (1985)
Tankki täyteen (1978)
Tanssii tähtien kanssa (2006)
Tanssit stadissa (1994)
Tapaus Ritva Valkama (1975)
Tapulikylä (1992)
Tarinatalo (1966)
Tarkkis (1986)
Tartu Mikkiin (2006)
Tasavallan presidentti (2007) (mini)
Tavallinen luokka (1993)
Team Ahma (1998)
Teijan keittiössä (1990)
Telakka (2003)
Tenavatähti (1990)
Terveysasema (1989)
Tervo & Päivärinta"The joulukalenteri (1997)The order - rahan jäljillä (2002) (mini)Thilia thalia thallallaa (1982)Thilia Thalia (1985)Thilia Thalia (1998)Tie Eedeniin (2003)Tie tähtiin (2000)TIE (2003)Tietopörssi (1995)Tiina (1991)Tikkurila-trilogia (2006) (mini)Tohelon ja Torvelon joulukalenteri (1998)Toini ja Heikki Haaman Show (1995)Toista maata (2003)Toni Wirtanen Undercover (2004)Tonttu Toljanteri: Tonttu-TV (2003)Tonttu Toljanterin Joulukalenteri (1989)Top 40 (2003)Tosihemmot (1994)Trabant express (1998)Trasselirakastaja (1999) (mini)Tsa tsa tsaa (1993)Tuliportaat (1998)Tumma ja hehkuva veri (1997) (mini)Tummien vesien tulkit (2002)Tunteen palo (1999)Tuntematon kaupunki II (2002)Tuntematon kaupunki (2000)Tuntemattomalle jumalalle (1993) (mini)Tuomitut (1995) (mini)Tupla tai kuitti (1958)Turvetta ja timantteja (2006)Tutkimusmatkailijat (2005)Tuttavamme Tarkat (1961)Tuttu juttu (1992)TV-uutiset ja sää (1960)Tähtilampun alla (1997)Tähtitehdas (1998)Täysin työkykyinen (2003) (mini)Täyttä taikaa (1995)Tää ei jää tähän (2006) (mini)Tää on seksii! (2002) (mini)Täällä Tesvisio (2004)

UUgrilampaat (1999)Uimakoulu (1995)Umpimähkä (2003)Unelmakämppä (2004)Urpo & Turpo (1996)Uskomattomia tarinoita (1991)Uskottu mies (1985)Uudisraivaaja (2006)Uuno Turhapuro (1996)Uutisvuoto (1998)

VV.I.P. seikkailu (2004)Vaarallinen risteys (2003)Vaarallista kokea (2003) (mini)Vaimonsa mies (2001)Vain muutaman huijarin tähden (1998)Vakavaa viihdettä (2002)Valehtelijoiden klubi (1981)Valehtelu virkistää (1990)Valhetta ja rakkautta (1997)Valiojoukko (2004)Vallan miehet (1986)Valmiina... Pyörii! (1967)Valomerkki (1991)Valotuksia (2004)Vapaa pudotus (2002)Varjo vain - savolainen eurodekkari (2003) (mini)Vasikantanssi (2003)Velipuolikuu (1983)Veljet (2008) (mini)Venny (2003) (mini)Verisiskot (1997)Vesku rempallaan (1992)Vesku show (1988)Vetää kaikista ovista (1978)Vi på lilla torget (1964)Videotreffit (1999)Viemäri-tv (1989)Vihreän kullan maa (1987)Viihdeohjelma Tukholma (1993)Viimeinen koukkaus (1990)Viimeiset siemenperunat (1993)Viiskulmasta itään (1993)Vill ni se på stjärnor? (1995)Vintiöt (1994)Vintti pimeenä (1999)Viuluviikarit musiikkimaassa (1979)Voimala (2003)Vuoroin vieraissa (1997)Vägg i vägg (1986)Vägsjälar (1998) (mini)

WW-tyyli (2003)Wiisikko (1990)

X
X-paroni (1964)

YYhdeksän miehen saappaat (1969) (mini)Yhteinen huone (2002)Yli rajojen - video vähemmistöjen äänenä (1988)Ylikävely (2008) (mini)Yokotai'' (2002)

External links
 Finnish TV at the Internet Movie Database

 
Finland
Television series